Local government elections were held in Azad Jammu and Kashmir on 27 November (Muzaffarabad division), 3 December 2022 (Poonch division) and 8 December 2022 (Mirpur division) in three phases. These local government elections were the first ones in more than three decades. The results were declared for each of the three phases on their respective voting days. The elections will be held under the supervision of Election Commission of Azad Jammu and Kashmir.

In phase I elections were held in the Muzaffarabad division's three districts of Muzaffarabad, Neelum, and Jhelum Valley. Pakistan Tehreek-e-Insaf (PTI) became largest party in first phase by leading in two of the three districts followed by Pakistan People's Party (PPP) and Pakistan Muslim League (N) (PML(N)), which were the 2nd and 3rd largest parties respectively. Voting began at 8:00 am and ran until 5:00 pm without any interruption.

In phase II elections were held in the Poonch division's four districts of Poonch, Haveli, Bagh and Sudhanoti. According to results from the second round of the local government elections, the Pakistan Tehreek-e-Insaf (PTI) was in the lead with 259 seats. Following the Pakistan Muslim League-Nawaz (PML-N) with 139 seats and the Pakistan People's Party (PPP)) took third position with 125 seats. Voting began at 8:00 am and ran until 5:00 pm without any interruption.

In phase III elections were held in the Mirpur division's three districts of Mirpur, Kotli and Bhimber. According to results from the third round of the local government elections, the Pakistan Tehreek-e-Insaf (PTI) was in the lead with 374 seats. Following the Pakistan Muslim League-Nawaz (PML-N) with 231 seats and the Pakistan People's Party (PPP) took third position with 140 seats. Voting began at 8:00 am and ran until 5:00 pm without any interruption.

Background 
The Supreme Court of Azad Jammu and Kashmir ordered the three-phase election in the mountainous region, which is being held after at least a 31-year hiatus. Part of the reason for this is that the federal government was unable to fulfil its responsibility to provide additional security personnel. Since the previous Local government (LG) elections in AJK were held in 1991 and the subsequent polls started to be scheduled in 1995, each government has been managing the LG institutions through the use of "administrators," who can either be government employees or party members.

The subject of LG elections had been pending in the AJK's superior courts since the beginning of the previous PML-N administration. The AJK Supreme Court had ordered the government to make preparations for LG elections by August 2022 in light of the 2017 census in December of last year after protracted legal proceedings.

On the government's request, the AJK Supreme Court reviewed the deadline in July 2022 and ordered that LG elections be held by October 15, 2022. The electoral commission then set the polling date for September 28. After then, the PPP and PML-N requested yet another extension, this time until March 2023, but the Supreme Court rejected their motion and extended the deadline to November 30 instead. The phase-wise election was announced for Muzaffarabad, Poonch, and Mirpur divisions on Nov 27, Dec 3, and Dec 8, respectively, even though the commission had set Nov 27 for voting throughout AJK due to Islamabad's refusal to provide an additional 40,000 personnel.

Elections 
In terms of political parties, Pakistan Muslim League (N) (PML-N), Pakistan Tehreek-e-Insaf (PTI), and Pakistan Peoples Party (PPP), will likely face off against each other in the elections. The PML-N and the PPP, two opposition parties, have teamed up. The Jammu and Kashmir Peoples Party, the All Jammu and Kashmir Muslim Conference, and Jamaat-i-Islami are contesting the election on their own and aim to win a respectable number of seats.

Election day 
1,323 polling places will be staffed by around 4,500 police officers, while a Quick Response Force (QRF) made up of 500 police officers will be on alert in the background to handle any emergencies. The divisional commissioners dispelled the notion that security measures were minimal by stating that the entire division had been split into 11 zones, 130 sectors, and 64 QRF points, each of which would be overseen by senior police and administration officials who had been given first-class magistrate authority.

Seats

Candidates

Muzaffarabad division

Poonch division

Mirpur division

Polling stations

Voter statistics

Results

Muzaffarabad division (Phase I)

Party wise results

Results by district council

Results by Municipal corporation

Poonch division (Phase II)

Party wise results

Results by district council

Results by municipal corporation

Results by union council

Results by municipal committee

Results by town committee

Mirpur division (Phase III)

Party wise results

Results by district council

Results by municipal corporation

Results by union council

Results by municipal committee

Results by town committee

See also 

 2021 Azad Kashmiri general election
 Azad Jammu & Kashmir Election Commission

References 

Azad
Azad
Politics of Azad Kashmir
Local elections in Pakistan
November 2022 events in Pakistan